Diego Segura Ramírez (born 16 June 1984) is a Spanish footballer who plays as a forward.

Club career
Segura was born in Seville, Andalusia. A product of hometown club Real Betis' youth ranks, he first appeared with the first team during the 2008–09 season, in three consecutive matches in late November/early December, due to injuries to teammates. His debut arrived as he played the last five minutes in the 2–3 away loss against Valencia CF.

In the summer of 2009, Segura was released following Betis' La Liga relegation, and signed a two-year contract with Deportivo Alavés of the third division. On 15 July 2010 he changed clubs again, joining Real Jaén also in the third level as a free agent.

References

External links

1984 births
Living people
Footballers from Seville
Spanish footballers
Association football forwards
La Liga players
Segunda División B players
Tercera División players
Betis Deportivo Balompié footballers
Real Betis players
Deportivo Alavés players
Real Jaén footballers
AD Ceuta footballers
FC Cartagena footballers
Marbella FC players
CD Alcalá players